In Ohio, State Route 30 may refer to:
U.S. Route 30 in Ohio, the only Ohio highway numbered 30 since 1927
Ohio State Route 30 (1923-1927), now SR 13 (Athens to Norwalk) and US 250 (Norwalk to Sandusky)

030